The Prix du livre incorrect is a French literary prize. It was created in 2006 by Jean Sévillia.

Lauréats 
 2007 : Éric de Montgolfier for Le Devoir de déplaire (Michel Lafon)
 2008 : Jean Clair for Malaise dans les musées (Flammarion)
 2009 : Patrick Rambaud for Deuxième chronique du règne de Nicolas Ier (Grasset)
 2010 : Éric Zemmour for Mélancolie française (Fayard)
 2011 : Christian Millau for Journal impoli (Le Rocher)
 2012 : 
 Pascal Bruckner for Le Fanatisme de l'apocalypse. Sauver la Terre, punir l'Homme (Grasset-Fasquelle)
 Christopher Caldwell for Une révolution sous nos yeux : comment l'islam va transformer la France et l'Europe (Toucan)
 2013 : Éric Naulleau for Pourquoi tant d’E.N. ? (Jean-Claude Gawsewitch)
 2014 : Lorànt Deutsch for Hexagone (Michel Lafon)
 2015 : 
 Gabriel Matzneff for Mais la musique soudain s'est tue : Journal 2009-2013 (Gallimard)
 Natacha Polony for Ce pays qu’on abat. Chroniques 2009-2014 (Plon)
 2016 : Marc Endeweld for Enquête sur un ministre qui dérange, L'ambigu Monsieur Macron (Flammarion)
 2017 : Camille Pascal for Ainsi Dieu choisit la France (Presses de la Renaissance)
 2018 : 
 Frédéric Gros for Désobéir (Albin-Michel/Flammarion)
 Maurizio Serra for D'Annunzio le magnifique (Grasset)
 2019 : Rémi Soulié for Racination (Pierre-Guillaume de Roux)

References

2006 establishments in France
French literary awards